Massimo Giacomini (born 14 August 1939) is a retired Italian football player and football manager.

Today, Giacomini is a TV pundit for the Italian television Udinese Channel.

References

External links

Enciclopediacalcio

1939 births
Sportspeople from Udine
Living people
Italian footballers
Association football midfielders
Udinese Calcio players
Genoa C.F.C. players
S.S. Lazio players
Brescia Calcio players
A.C. Milan players
U.S. Triestina Calcio 1918 players
Serie A players
Serie B players
Italian football managers
Udinese Calcio managers
Treviso F.B.C. 1993 managers
U.S. Salernitana 1919 managers
A.C. Milan managers
Torino F.C. managers
S.S.C. Napoli managers
U.S. Triestina Calcio 1918 managers
A.C. Perugia Calcio managers
Venezia F.C. managers
Brescia Calcio managers
Cagliari Calcio managers
Serie A managers
Serie B managers
Footballers from Friuli Venezia Giulia